What the Master Would Not Discuss (alternatively known as Xin Qixie ) is a collection of supernatural stories compiled by Qing Dynasty scholar and writer Yuan Mei.

The work has also been called What the Master Does not Speak of and other such titles, as well as Censored by Confucius in one translated work of selected tales.

Title
The title of the work Zi bu yu refers to the passage of the Analects of Confucius that states, "The topics the Master did not speak of were prodigies, force, disorder and gods" His reference to the master was criticised as a 'heretical' use of Confucian texts.

Yuan later changed the title to Xin Qixie ("New Wonder Tales of Qi/from Qi") when he discovered there was a Yuan dynasty text with the title What the Master Would Not Discuss. However, Yuan's collection is still commonly known by its original title.

The original anthology appeared in 24 volumes, and a sequel anthology followed in 10 volumes under the title Xu xin Qi xie ("A Sequel to New Wonder Tales of Qi"). The 34 total volumes combined boasts a content exceeding 1,000 short stories and accounts.

Release
Zi Buyi first appeared in print in 1788. In contrast to the prevailing Confucian orthodoxy of the imperial court, the 747 short stories depicted a rich tapestry of daily life, including themes of ghosts, sex, betrayal, revenge, transvestism, homosexuality, and corruption. However, Yuan defended the collection, as the whims of an ageing man enjoying his last days as much as possible, though the content of his stories relates to many of his personal grievances with the Confucian establishment.

The work was so popular that the government censored it in 1836 during attempts to suppress anti-establishment sentiment.

Stories
The stories were collected over a lengthy period of time. The sources included oral accounts from friends and relatives, official gazettes, or other collections.

In popular culture
One of the supernatural creatures mentioned in this collection called the Hua Po (花魄), literally Floral Spirit, is a recurring demon in the popular Japanese video game series Megami Tensei.

External links

China Knowledge

Explanatory notes

References

Citations

Works cited

 

 

 

 

Chinese literature
Jiangshi fiction
Fictional depictions of Bao Zheng in literature
Chinese short story collections